Belcher-Holden Farm is a historic home and farm complex located at Newark Valley in Tioga County, New York. The house is a two-story structure composed of a front gabled block on the north, a large gabled wing on the south, and a long woodshed addition on the southwest corner of the side-gabled wing.  It was built between about 1810 and 1820 and features delicate Federal carving in the front entrance.  The farm complex consists of a barn (1898), silo (ca. 1920–1950), granary (ca. 1870–1900), and chicken coop (ca. 1920-1950s).

It was listed on the National Register of Historic Places in 1997.

References

Houses on the National Register of Historic Places in New York (state)
Federal architecture in New York (state)
Houses completed in 1820
Houses in Tioga County, New York
National Register of Historic Places in Tioga County, New York